A Beech Wood with Gypsies Seated in the Distance is a painting by J.M.W. Turner (23 April 1775 - 19 December 1851), painted c. 1799–1801.

References

Paintings by J. M. W. Turner